Gagan Kumar Thapa  (born 19 July 1976) is a Nepali politician and youth leader, who is the current General Secretary of the Nepali Congress. He is currently serving as a Member of Parliament in the House of Representatives, Nepal from Kathmandu since 2008, and is currently in its Parliamentary Committee on Education and Health. He served  as the Minister of Health and Population of Nepal from 2016 to 2017.

He was elected for the first time as a Member of the First Constitutional Assembly from 2008 elections from proportional representation. From the 12th General Convention of the Nepali Congress, became Central Committee Member of the Nepal Congress. He won the 2013 elections as a Member of the Second Constitutional Assembly following the failure of the first assembly to promulgate a constitution, serving as the Health Minister from 2016 to 2017. He won in 2017 for the 2nd time from Kathmandu 4. He won for third time from the same constituency in 2022.

Early life and education 
Thapa was born in a conservative middle-class Chhetri family. His parents were originally from the Solukhumbu District. Born and raised in Kathmandu, Thapa graduated from Siddhartha Vanasthali School in 1992. He finished his Bachelors of Science in Chemistry from Tri Chandra College in 1998. He completed his M.A Sociology from Tribhuvan University in 2003.

Political life

Student leader and democracy activist
Thapa was the president of the Free Student Union of Tri Chandra College from 1998 to 2000. He was a Committee Member of the Nepal Students Union from 1998 to 2002, Vice President from 2000 to 2002, and its General Secretary from 2002 to 2004.

After the dissolution of Parliament and declaration of emergency by King Gyanendra, Thapa took a vehement stand against the royal regime and called for the establishment of a republic. He called for greater involvement of youth in the movement, and called on students to take to the streets to launch a decisive movement for the restoration of democracy. He was jailed on charges of sedition in 2004. On 26 April 2005, he and two other NSU activists were arrested but released on 5 May after the Supreme Court deemed their detention illegal. Thapa was immediately rearrested and served with a 90-day detention order under the Public Security Act (PSA). He was declared a Prisoner of Conscience by Amnesty International. Following a Special Court order in July 2005, Thapa was arrested from the Singha Durbar Ward Police Station where he had gone to meet his colleagues, and was subsequently interrogated by The Office of the Kathmandu District Government Attorney for his involvement in 'offense against the state' by chanting anti-monarchy slogans at a rally. Following immense international pressure, Thapa was released in August 2005.

The same month, Thapa announced his candidacy for the President of the Nepal Student Union (NSU), the student wing of the Nepal Congress Party (NC). Thapa was excluded from the race by Nepal Congress Party President, Girija Prasad Koirala, on charges of being 'agents of the palace' alongside NC Central Member Narhari Acharya. During the 10th General Convention of the NSU in Pokhara, there were fights between the Koirala faction and the Thapa faction. Thapa accused the party leadership of preventing the closed-door session from being held to forestall adoption of a pro-republican agenda

In January 2006, Thapa urged the youth to boycott the municipal polls. The democracy movement succeeded in April. In May, he called for leaders of political parties to make public their personal property. Thapa was seen as an advocate of peaceful protests. On 2 July 2006, Thapa in an interview with BBC News on the fifth anniversary of Nepalese royal massacre asserted that "..The Nepalese have begun writing a new autobiography for Nepal, an autobiography with a vision, philosophy and an ideology; a distinct autobiography with socio-economic and cultural harmony and prosperity; an autobiography displaying the life and history of the common men and women of Nepal." He also continued advocate for the abolition of monarchy throughout 2006. During the 12th National Convention of the NSU in 2007, Thapa pulled out his candidacy for the post of President, claiming that "The NC leadership has remained biased against me and therefore I have declared that I would not contest".

Constituent Assembly member (2008 - 2013) 

Gagan Thapa was elected to the First Constituent Assembly (CA) under the party-list proportional representation system from Nepali Congress. He served in the Fundamental Rights and Directive Principle of the Constituent Assembly and the Natural Resources and Means Committee of the Legislative Parliament.

Thapa won a seat in the Central Working Committee of Nepali Congress in the 12th National Convention held in 2010, receiving the highest number of votes.

Member of Legislature Parliament (2013 - 2017) 

Thapa was elected as a Member of Parliament of the Second Constituent Assembly following election in November 2013, following the failure of the first CA. ThapaHe won from Kathmandu-4 with 22,336 votes against candidates Nirmal Kuikel of CPN (UML) (9,028 votes) and Nanda Kishor Pun (Pashang) of the UCPN Maoists (6,462 votes). He was also chairman of the Agriculture and Water Resources Committee. He urged for the formation of a commission to settle issues of provincial boundaries with the mandate to demarcate provincial boundaries quickly, adding that the new constitution should be promulgated without finalizing the boundaries of proposed provinces. Thapa also pushed the government to address the Madhes agitation by addressing the demands of Madhes, further blaming the government for promoting black marketing in the face of the 2015 Nepal Blockade and the Terai unrest, right after the 2015 Earthquake. He condemned the blockade imposed by India, terming it "an inhuman move". In December 2013, Thapa endorsed the campaign "No Thanks, I Carry My Own Bag".

Livable Kathmandu Campaign 
Thapa started the Livable Kathmandu Campaign, which was an effort towards the sustainable development of the Kathmandu Valley. He started a series of "Livable Kathmandu Forum" moderated by himself, where he talked about the importance of sustainable development of basic infrastructural facilities in light of the 20-year Strategic Development Master Plan (SDMP) of the Kathmandu Valley Development Authority. The document "Livable Kathmandu", a sustainable urban development policy proposal, was "submitted to the Prime Minister to be developed as a Kathmandu development policy document, which could also serve as a policy guideline for Nepal’s other urban and urbanizing centers."

Minister of Health (2016 - 2017) 
On 26 August 2016, Thapa was sworn into office as the Minister for Health by President Bidhya Devi Bhandari. He began office with a vow to address Dr. Govinda KC's demands on health reformation, and focusing on three main issues along with constitution implementation - tabling medical sector laws, building infrastructure, and resource collection. He donated his salary of the first month as Health Minister to the oncology fund set up in Kanti Children's Hospital.

In December 2016, Thapa launched the National HIV Strategic Plan 2016-2021: Nepal HIVision 2020, a five-year plan aimed at eradicating the AIDS epidemic in the country by 2030. The government made a license mandatory to sell tobacco products from March 2017. It was made illegal for pregnant women and persons under 18 to buy or sell tobacco products. On 13 April 2017, he announced a new health campaign "Healthy Myself, Healthy Nation" where "every citizen would be encouraged to make five commitments – to abstain from tobacco and alcohol, to do regular exercise, to have regular nutritious diet, to do regular health check-up, to be aware about health of self and family – for a healthy lifestyle." Thapa emphasized that "primary focus will be on schools where students are encouraged to exercise and eat fresh foods instead of junk foods."

During Thapa's ministership, Human Organ Transplant Regulation was introduced making it possible to transplant organs from brain-dead patients. The new law allowed the receiving of eight organs - kidneys, lungs, heart, liver, pancreas, small intestine, corneas and skin from a brain dead person. Liver transplant service was started for the first time in the country. The government made surgery of gout heart disease and dialysis service for kidney patients free. The Supreme Court made it legal for couples with infertility to use surrogacy services. The Health Ministry limited treatment expenses of VIPs up to Rs 1.5 million, and opened the Army Hospital for the general public. It directed all government hospitals to open from 9:00am to 3:00pm (intensive service from 3:00pm to 5:00pm) and to set up information centres at all hospitals. Thapa enforced the Pharmacy Guideline introduced by the Department of Drug Administration in 2011, and subsequently, the Ministry directed the hospitals under its aegis to run own pharmacies, and started closing down unregistered pharmacies. Thapa further delegated Rs. 311.5 million to regional health directorates and Rs 1.8-8 million to district hospitals to buy medicines directly, bypassing an otherwise cumbersome procedure.

National Health Insurance Act 
Under the Act, a family of five is entitled to Rs. 50,000 per year for medical attention after paying a premium of Rs. 2,500 per year, with subsidy on the premium for the poor, disabled and elderly and a family identified as impoverished, poor and marginalized will get 100%, 75% and 50% discounts respectively. The Act also makes health insurance mandatory, and has a budget for a health safety net. Under the Act, the government also covers some of the cost for impoverished patients requiring treatment for heart or kidney diseases cancer, Alzheimer's, Parkinson's, Sickle cell anaemia, head and spinal injury. The scheme is known as Bipanna Nagarik Kosh, and patients need an official letter attesting to their weak economic status. The new policy has also introduced a payer-provider split, and the insurer will manage reimbursement both to private and public facilities. Unlike in the past, the head of the Insurance Board will be nominated by the cabinet and will be independent from the Ministry of Health. In the journal Health Affairs, Thapa says "Nepal will have to innovate on delivery of longitudinal care across the lifetimes of citizens in both homes and communities … leveraging our rich history of community-based, preventive care delivery."

Member of Parliament (2017 - Present) 
Thapa was elected as a Member of Parliament in the 2017 Nepalese Legislative Election in December 2017 from Kathmandu-4 for the second time consecutively. He is a member of the Parliamentary Committee on Education and Health.

While campaigning during the election, Thapa along with 10 others was injured when an IED exploded at Chapali Height in Kathmandu. Thapa suffered minor injuries to his head and back in the explosion. There was a lot of outrage, both from Nepali Congress leaders as well leaders of opposition and other parties, directed at the government following the government's inability to figure out the perpetrators, given that Thapa's party was in majority control of the government at the time.

Thapa was critical of the Information Technology Bill on grounds of it "curtailing the fundamental rights of people to freedom of expression and opinion, and was hence against the spirit of the constitution." On 29 November 2018, Thapa had called for a civil disobedience against the 4 day odd-even traffic rule issued to manage the Asia Pacific Summit 2018 by the government. Thapa commented that the organization had a controversial history of accusations of mass proselytism as well as the illegal promotion of Christianity and the public should not suffer for such an unjust cause.

Intraparty politics

Bid for general secretary 
In March 2016, Thapa unsuccessfully contested for the post of the Nepali Congress Party's general secretary, competing against Arjun Narsingh KC (his father-in-law), and Shashank Koirala. He was the only candidate who represented the youth among the 10 aspirants of office bearer positions in the country's oldest and largest political party. As a Central Committee Member, Thapa has called for a change in the Nepali Congress's leadership through a special party convention. Thapa also lead the party's central publicity and communication committee for the federal and provincial elections.

14th General Convention 
Thapa was one of the candidates for the post of General Secretary in the 14th general convention of Nepali Congress from the anti-establishment faction led by Shekhar Koirala. Thapa had publicized a 60-page document before the commencement of the general convention that consisted the party's programmes and policies for the upcoming one year till general elections and for the upcoming five years after the general elections. He was elected along with Bishwa Prakash Sharma who represented the Prakash Man Singh camp. Of the 4,379 votes cast, Thapa received 3,023 votes while Sharma got 1,984 votes.

Party reformation 
Thapa has long expressed his desire for party reformation and has worked to that end for more than a decade, calling for the replacement of the general and active membership in 2015 He has called for a change the working style of political leadership in light of leaders inability to reach the aspiration of the new generation of Nepalis, and called for the Nepal Congress to "lead the implementation of the new constitution" in 2016. He has also repeatedly called for more involvement of the youth in leadership positions and expressed his belief in the party as the "only defender of the country, able to move the country ahead by taking all the communities of the hills, mountains and the Tarai into confidence." Thapa, along with other youth leaders, launched the "Nepali Congress Rejuvenation Campaign" in February 2018. In 2009, Thapa had accused senior leaders like Sher Bahadur Deuba, and Girija Prasad Koirala of trying to run the Nepal Congress Party like a private company. In 2018, Thapa further remarked that Congress President Deuba shouldn't be the parliamentary party leader as well, as the responsibilities of a parliamentary party leader would be hard to achieve if "one person has two important posts".

Following from his pledge to transform the party during his bid for General Secretary in 2016, Thapa presented a 51-page report in the ongoing meeting of the Central Working Committee on behalf of youth leaders demanding an early general convention by amending the party statute through the Congress Maha Samiti. Following months of discussions and debates of rival camps of the party, the Nepali Congress Central Working Committee unanimously endorsed the draft statute with provisions that will ‘strengthen internal democracy, make the party more inclusive and address factionalism’. Thapa remarked that the Party President Sher Bahadur Deuba had ignored the voice of Dr. Shekhar Koirala's faction after the General Convention as seen in the recent nominations in the Bagmati Province government.

Personal life 
In 2008, Thapa married Anjana KC, daughter of Arjun Narsingh KC.

Electoral history

2022 Nepalese general election

2017 Nepalese general election

2013 Constituent Assembly election

References

Books

External links 
 
 Lancet Global Health Commission
 World Economic Forum
 Gagan Thapa on Twitter
 Gagan Thapa on Facebook

Living people
1976 births
Nepali Congress politicians from Bagmati Province
Government ministers of Nepal
People from Morang District
Nepal MPs 2017–2022
Tri-Chandra College alumni
Members of the 1st Nepalese Constituent Assembly
Members of the 2nd Nepalese Constituent Assembly
Nepal MPs 2022–present